Music of the Spheres (subtitled Vol I. From Earth with Love) is the ninth studio album by British rock band Coldplay, released on 15 October 2021 by Parlophone in the United Kingdom and Atlantic Records in the United States. The album was produced by Max Martin, who is a new producer to the band's discography. It features guest appearances from Selena Gomez, We Are King, Jacob Collier and BTS, as well as returning contributions from electronic producer Jon Hopkins.

The album is the band's second space-themed concept album, after 2005's X&Y, and explores pop, pop rock, space rock, space music and ambient influences. It is set in a fictional planetary system called The Spheres, which contains nine planets, three natural satellites, a star and a nebula, with each one of them corresponding to a certain track on the record. According to lead singer Chris Martin, its concept and themes were inspired by the Star Wars film franchise, which made him and the other band members wonder what other artists could be like across the universe, while also using the planets as canvas to explore human experience.

In anticipation for the album, they released "Higher Power" and "My Universe" as singles, with the former being nominated for Best Pop Duo/Group Performance at the 64th Annual Grammy Awards, and the latter being nominated for the same award at the 65th Annual Grammy Awards. "My Universe" also debuted at number one in the Billboard Hot 100 chart, making Coldplay the first British group in history to achieve the feat. "Let Somebody Go" was later released as the third official single on 7 February 2022. "Coloratura", "People of the Pride", "Biutyful" and a live version of "Humankind" were served as promotional singles.

Music of the Spheres received mixed reviews from critics, many of whom criticised the album's overtly pop sensibilities and style. The closing track "Coloratura", however, received critical acclaim for its lengthy, unconventional structure and production. The album earned nods for Album of the Year and Best Pop Vocal Album at the 65th Annual Grammy Awards, marking the band's third nomination in both categories. It debuted atop the UK Albums Chart as the first project since Ed Sheeran's No.6 Collaborations Project (2019) to sell over 100,000 units during its first week. To support the record, Coldplay embarked on the Music of the Spheres World Tour.

Background 
The idea for a space-themed record had been envisioned by the band since 2010, when lead vocalist Chris Martin proposed a project of building "a solar system", as stated in a blog published by the band, named "Roadie #42". This project eventually led to the creation of the universe for Coldplay's 2011 album Mylo Xyloto, which would go on to inspire the Music of the Spheres universe as well. At the time Everyday Life was released, in November 2019, one of the hints was hidden within the bifold of the booklet of the physical vinyl and digibook editions of the album, in which a black and white billboard in a field advertises "Music of the Spheres". In the bottom left corner, smaller writing says "Coldplay coming soon". This, combined with the band's history of teasers for future material, fueled speculation about Music of the Spheres's themes and release date. Other hints to future material were purportedly hidden within song lyrics and music videos from the Everyday Life era.

Recording 
According to bassist Guy Berryman, when the band first "made Everyday Life (2019), we knew we weren't planning on touring it, so that directed the course of that album musically. The idea was always to follow that up with Music of the Spheres, which definitely would be toured. So the new album was created with one eye on the live performances. I think that shaped the overall energy levels and song selections for the album". The record was produced by Max Martin, whom the band called "a true wonder of the universe". Their first work together was in the single "Orphans". He met Chris during a Rihanna concert in Sweden in 2016 and they started to share potential about possible collaborations, with the rest of the band sharing the same feeling and considering him as a "new band member" for the album.

Chris stated Max was very involved on most of the creative process, helping to decide which songs would be chosen as well. He added that "just before 'Higher Power', I'd done a whole session with him auditioning songs for a potential album". Drummer Will Champion noted one of the reasons of feeling certain relief while working with Max "is that he is very conscious of not filling too many gaps", with Berryman further adding that a sound "will not be impressive by just adding another layer of sound and another layer of sound", comparing it to a mix of "too many colors together, [but] you always end up with brown". They cited "Humankind" as an example, which was according to them was the hardest song to be recorded in the album, as the band "couldn't get the feel of it right until the end of the sessions".

Style and concept 
Music of the Spheres has been described as pop, pop rock, synth-pop, space rock, space music, electropop, soft rock, and ambient. Lead singer Chris Martin stated that the theme for the album was inspired by "wonder[ing] what musicians would be like across the universe" after watching the fictional Mos Eisley cantina band perform in Star Wars and making speculations in relation to outer space sounds.

The album is set in a fictional planetary system called The Spheres, which consists of nine planets, three natural satellites, one star and a nearby nebula. Each track on the album represents a celestial body from The Spheres. Following the album's track listing, they are: Neon Moon I ("Music of the Spheres"), Kaotica ("Higher Power"), Echo ("Humankind"), Kubik ("Alien Choir"), Calypso ("Let Somebody Go"), Supersolis ("Human Heart"), Ultra ("People of the Pride"), Floris ("Biutyful"), Neon Moon II ("Music of the Spheres II"), Epiphane ("My Universe"), Infinity Station ("Infinity Sign"), and Coloratura ("Coloratura"). Supersolis is the star at the centre of the system, and Coloratura is the Nebula. Each celestial body in The Spheres has its own language: EL 1 for Neon Moon I, Kaotican for Kaotica, Mirror Text for Echo, Qblok for Kubik, Aquamarine for Calypso, Supersolar for Supersolis, Voltik for Ultra, Bloom for Floris, EL 2 for Neon Moon II, Spheric for Epiphane, Infinitum for Infinity Station, and Coloraturan for Coloratura. An unnamed natural satellite orbits Echo, while both Neon Moons orbit Epiphane. A lost planet named Aurora is also part of the system, and although no song on the album represents it, fans have theorised that the short instrumental "A Wave", which was played at the end of concerts during the first leg of the Music of the Spheres World Tour, is connected to it. The artwork featuring the planetary system was created by Pilar Zeta, who had worked on Coldplay's previous two albums Everyday Life (2019) and A Head Full of Dreams (2015).

Martin uses the planets as a canvas to explore the human experience: "It's really another record about life as a human person, but given this freedom that comes when you pretend it's about other creatures in other places". Drummer Will Champion stated that Everyday Life was about making big questions personal, while Music of the Spheres promoted more about the purpose of the band in relation to humanity and manmade demarcations, saying: "We historically as a band tend to fill space". The album was promoted with the words "Everyone is an alien somewhere", which, according to Champion, was about persons look to what unites them, not to what separate them, saying: "From the perspective from another planet, we would be the aliens. We searched the perspective where we are all equal".

The fictional universe for Music of the Spheres is in part inspired by the universe created by the band for their 2011 album Mylo Xyloto, and, according to creative director Phil Harvey, features several references to it. One of these references may be the appearance of the Mylo Xyloto "silencers" in the music video for "My Universe".

Promotion 
On 23 April 2021, a post from an account titled 'Alien Radio FM' on social media released a set of coordinates (51°30'24.6"N 0°08'34.4"W) that led to Green Park in Piccadilly, London. The post included a photo of an advertisement at these coordinates with unknown bright neon purple characters set to a blue background. The characters were quickly decoded by fan sites and said "Coldplay Higher Power May Seven". Similar posts would follow, which all teased the lead single, "Higher Power".

On 29 April, Coldplay confirmed on their main social media accounts that a new single called "Higher Power" would in fact be released on 7 May. Branded as a form of "extraterrestrial transmission", the band previewed the video to French European Space Agency astronaut Thomas Pesquet aboard the International Space Station prior to its public release. Lead singer Chris Martin had stated that the theme for their upcoming music had been inspired by "wonder[ing] what musicians are like across the universe" after watching the fictional Mos Eisley cantina band perform in Star Wars.

After the promotion cycle of "Higher Power" was done, creative director Phil Harvey teased a possible announcement on 19 July 2021. During the next day, Coldplay revealed the album, its tracklist, and a trailer titled "Overtura" containing a snippet for each song. They also said that the song "Coloratura" would be released on 23 July, while the next official single would follow in September. On 13 September, Coldplay announced that their second single "My Universe" which features BTS, would be released on 24 September 2021. On 4 October 2021, Selena Gomez confirmed via Twitter that she is featured on "Let Somebody Go".

On 7 October 2021, Coldplay announced that an album launch event for Music of the Spheres, entitled "The Atmospheres", would be held in four cities across the world (Berlin, London, New York and Tokyo) on 15 and 16 October. In each city, there was a "custom-built installation" that enabled fans to "be transported to The Spheres – the distant solar system that plays host to the band's latest album, where each of the twelve tracks is twinned with a different planet." During the event, fans had the opportunity to "create their own alien language messages, snap selfies in the augmented reality photo booth, and even help to power the experience through bespoke kinetic walkways." According to the band, the event was made possible by partnering with Amazon Music.

World tour 

On 14 October 2021, a day before the release of Music of the Spheres, Coldplay officially announced the Music of the Spheres World Tour in 2022 to promote the album. The band had not toured for their previous album, Everyday Life, as they had decided to pause touring until they could work out how to ensure that it would be environmentally friendly. Alongside the announcement, they released a detailed plan setting out how they would ensure that the tour would have a minimal impact on the environment and would result in 50% less carbon dioxide generated than during the A Head Full of Dreams Tour. The plan was developed over two years by Coldplay and a number of leading environmental experts, and features a number of innovative sustainability strategies. For example, the band have joined forces with BMW to create the first "mobile, rechargeable show battery" to power each concert on the tour, and have announced that the tour's stage will be built from "a combination of lightweight, low-carbon and re-usable materials (including bamboo and recycled steel) that can be properly reused or recycled at the end of the tour". They have also pledged to plant one tree for every ticket sold.

Singles 
"Higher Power" was released as the lead single on 7 May 2021. The song was produced by Max Martin, whom the band called "a true wonder of the universe". The band stated in a tweet that "it arrived on a little keyboard and a bathroom sink at the start of 2020". An audio visualiser directed by Paul Dugdale premiered on Coldplay's YouTube channel at 12:01 a.m. BST on the same day. The official music video, directed by Dave Meyers, was released on 8 June 2021, it features Chris exploring the fictional planet Kaotica.

"My Universe", a collaboration with South Korean pop group BTS, was released as the second single on 24 September 2021. The official music video, also directed by Meyers, was released on 30 September 2021. It features both groups performing the song alongside a fictional band named "Supernova 7" in different futuristic planets, set during an era where music is banned around the universe. The track debuted at number one in Billboard Hot 100, which made Coldplay the first British group in history to achieve the feat. It was their second United States chart-topper and BTS' sixth.

"Let Somebody Go", a collaboration with American singer and actress Selena Gomez, was released as the third single in the adult contemporary radio on 14 February 2022. A music video was released a week prior, on 7 February 2022, once again being directed by Meyers.

Promotional singles 
The album's closing track, "Coloratura", was released on 23 July 2021 in anticipation for the album. It is the longest song ever released by the band, running at 10 minutes and 18 seconds. "People of the Pride" impacted American alternative rock radio stations on 8 March 2022, however, Chris stated during an interview the song would not be marketed as an official single. Its lyrics explore themes of human politics and is inspired by empowerment movements. A music video was directed by Paul Dugdale and released on 15 March 2022. A live version of "Humankind" was released as a charity single on 22 April 2022 through Bandcamp for Earth Day 2022, with royalties being donated to EarthPercent, a project supporting numerous organizations working to help tackle the climate crisis. The music video was directed by Stevie Rae Gibbs and Marcus Haney, being released on 17 August 2022 to further promote the Music of the Spheres World Tour (2022). On 16 September 2022, the song was then released as a promotional single in Italian and Dutch radio stations serving the same purpose. "Biutyful" was made available as a promotional single on 6 July 2022 along with a video directed by Mat Whitecross.

Critical reception 

Music of the Spheres received generally mixed reviews from critics. At Metacritic, which assigns a normalised rating out of 100 to reviews from mainstream critics, the album has an average score of 55 out of 100 based on 18 reviews, which indicates "mixed or average reviews". Ludovic Hunter-Tilney of the Financial Times gave the album two stars out of five, praising its cheerful lyrics but criticising its superficial feeling. This sentiment was echoed by Neil McCormick of The Daily Telegraph, which called the album a "giddy sugar rush" and gave it three stars out of five. Alexis Petridis of The Guardian also gave the album two stars out of five, calling its pop tones a "desperate" attempt by the band to stay on top of the record charts. Rhian Daly of NME gave the album four stars out of five, and said that "While Music of the Spheres feels like quintessential Coldplay, there are some more surprising moments buried in its tracklist". Neil Z. Yeung of AllMusic also gave the album four stars out of five, calling it "[the band's] most unabashedly pop-centric and optimistic album to date". He elaborated thus: "This sci-fi concept piece is the spiritual successor to technicolor predecessors Mylo Xyloto and A Head Full of Dreams – outpacing both with its sharp focus and lean runtime – while maintaining the boundary-pushing energy heard on the Kaleidoscope EP and Everyday Life". The Courier and Uproxx included the album on their unranked lists of "Top Favorite Albums of 2021", and "The Best Pop Albums of 2021", respectively. Meanwhile, G1 chose it as part of their "Albums That Defined 2021" editorial.

Many of the critics, however, praised the closing track, "Coloratura". AllMusic's Neil Z. Yeung stated "while they typically end their albums on a grand, uplifting note, ["Coloratura"] takes the prize for ambition and sheer beauty". Ella Kemp, writing for Rolling Stone UK, said the song "might be the most dazzling thing Coldplay have ever done, a sprawling Pink Floyd-esque experiment which pays off infinitely". Will Hodgkinson of The Times called it as a "forward-thinking vision of a melodic utopia with shades of Pink Floyd at their most hopeful". Jeremy Levine of PopMatters praised the track "plenty of structural risks that allow it to achieve a surprising level of intimacy. It's still a little lyrically over-the-top, but the variations in tone, as well as the climactic use of the band's retro instrumentation, leave us with at least one flicker of Coldplay's brilliance". Ludovic Hunter-Tilney of the Financial Times felt the album's concept "only really registers" on "Coloratura", praising the elaborate orchestrations and "more sophisticated lyrics than the gaucheries of the previous songs". Paolo Ragusa of Consequence agreed, saying the song "really flesh out what the record is supposed to sound like: sprawling, odd, and unique". Bobby Olivier of Spin, however, felt it was "overlong", while David Cobbald of The Line of Best Fit said it "lacks a sense of originality, as all of emotions and lyrics have in way appeared in their music previously".

Accolades

Commercial performance 
Music of the Spheres debuted at number one on the UK Albums Chart with 101,045 units sold, marking Coldplay's ninth number-one album and the fastest selling record of the year at the time of release, being the first project since Ed Sheeran's No.6 Collaborations Project to debut with over 100,000 units sold in the country. According to Music Week, the record was one of the key releases which contributed to the increase of CD sales during 2021, along with Adele's 30, Sheeran's = and ABBA's Voyage. It was also the fifth and 15th best-selling album of the year in the cassette and vinyl formats, respectively.

Track listing 
Coldplay's songwriting members are Guy Berryman, Jonny Buckland, Will Champion and Chris Martin.

Notes
 "Music of the Spheres" is stylised as "" and occasionally rendered as "Music of the Spheres I".
 "Alien Choir" is stylised as "".
 "Human Heart" is stylised as "".
 "Music of the Spheres II" is stylised as "".
 "Infinity Sign" is stylised as "".

Sample credits
 "People of the Pride" samples the song "Black and Gold", as performed by Sam Sparro and written by Sparro and Jesse Rogg.

Personnel 

 Guy Berryman – bass guitar, percussion , keyboards
 Will Champion – drums, percussion, keyboards, backing vocals, programming 
 Jonny Buckland – guitars, keyboards, backing vocals , percussion 
 Chris Martin – lead vocals, guitars, piano, keyboards, rhythm guitar 

 Max Martin – backing vocals 
 Denise Carite – choir vocalist 
 Bill Rahko – additional vocals 
 Apple Martin – additional vocals 
 Stevie Mackey – choir vocalist 
 Dorian Holley – choir vocalist 
 Neka Hamilton – choir vocalist 
 Selena Gomez – vocals 
 We Are King – vocals 
 Jin – vocals 
 Suga – vocals 
 J-Hope – vocals 
 RM – vocals 
 Jimin – vocals 
 V – vocals 
 Jungkook – vocals 
 Amber Strother – additional vocals 
 Jacob Collier – additional vocals 
 Tate McDowell – additional vocals 
 Rik Simpson – additional vocals 

 Max Martin – keyboards, additional keyboards 
 Federico Vindver – keyboards 
 Oscar Holter – guitar, keyboards 
 Bill Rahko – keyboards, theremin 
 Dan Green – keyboards 
 Davide Rossi – strings 
 John Metcalfe – strings 
 Jon Hopkins – keyboards 
 Paris Strother – synthesizer 
 Rik Simpson – additional keyboards 

 Max Martin – production and programming
 Oscar Holter – production and programming
 Bill Rahko – production and programming
 Pdogg – vocal recording engineering, production engineering
 Rik Simpson – additional production
 Dan Green – additional production and programming
 Serban Ghenea – mixing engineer
 Randy Merrill – mastering engineer
 John Hanes – engineering
 Michael Ilbert – engineering
 Connor Panayi – assistant engineering
 Duncan Fuller – assistant engineering
 Karl-Ola Kjellholm – assistant engineering
 Linn Fijal – assistant engineering
 Tate McDowell – assistant engineering
 Love Choir – choir arrangement
 The Dream Team – additional production
 Miguel Lara – engineering
 Emma Marks – engineering assistant
 Duncan Fuller – engineering assistant
 Cherif Hashizume – additional programmer

 Pilar Zeta – design and art direction

Charts

Weekly charts

Year-end charts

Certifications and sales

Release history

See also 
 List of number-one albums of 2021 (Australia)
 List of number-one albums of 2021 (Belgium)
 List of number-one albums of 2021 (France)
 List of number-one albums of 2021 (Ireland)
 List of number-one albums of 2021 (Portugal)
 List of number-one albums of 2021 (Scotland)
 List of number-one albums of 2021 (Spain)
 List of number-one albums of the 2020s (Czech Republic)
 List of UK Albums Chart number ones of the 2020s

Notes

References

External links 
 

2021 albums
Albums produced by Jon Hopkins
Albums produced by Max Martin
Albums produced by Rik Simpson
Atlantic Records albums
Coldplay albums

Parlophone albums
Science fiction concept albums
Albums produced by Oscar Holter
Albums produced by Metro Boomin